Psorothamnus arborescens is a species of flowering plant in the legume family known by the common name Mojave indigo bush.

Distribution
Psorothamnus arborescens is native to southwestern North America, where it can be found in many types of desert and dry mountainous habitats.

It is found in the Californian Mojave Desert and Colorado Desert, south into the Sonoran Desert in the Mexican state of Sonora, east past the Sierra Nevada into the Nevada Great Basin desert, and west into the San Bernardino Mountains of Southern California.
Also found in northwest Arizona in the Joshua Tree National Forest.

Description
The leaves are each made up of a few pairs of green linear to oval leaflets up to a centimeter in length.

The inflorescence is a long raceme of many flowers with reddish green calyces of sepals and bright purple pealike corollas up to a centimeter long.

The fruit is a glandular legume pod up to a centimeter long containing one seed.

Varieties
The varieties of this species are generally similar in appearance but more restricted in distribution:
Psorothamnus arborescens var. arborescens (syn: Dalea fremontii var. saundersii (Parish) Munz) - southwestern Mojave Desert,  elevation.
Psorothamnus arborescens var. minutifolius - White and Inyo Mountains, Mojave sky islands, east of Sierra Nevada,  elevation.

References

External links
Calflora Database: Psorothamnus arborescens (California Dalea,  Mojave indigo bush)
Jepson Manual eFlora (TJM2) treatment - Psorothamnus arborescens
USDA Plants Profile for Psorothamnus arborescens
Psorothamnus arborescens - U.C. Photo gallery

arborescens
Flora of California
Flora of Nevada
Flora of Sonora
Flora of the California desert regions
Flora of the Great Basin
Flora of the Sonoran Deserts
Natural history of the Colorado Desert
Natural history of the Mojave Desert
Natural history of the Peninsular Ranges
Flora without expected TNC conservation status